Strobilanthes wightiana is a species of plant in the genus Strobilanthes of the family Acanthaceae, commonly called the "Wight's kurinji". It is endemic to Southern Western Ghats. It prefers evergreen and semi-evergreen forests.

Description 
Wight's kurinji is a shrub with hairy branches. It bears a few pale blue flowers.

References

External links 

wightiana